Interspecific pregnancy (literally pregnancy between species, also called interspecies pregnancy or xenopregnancy) is the pregnancy involving an embryo or fetus belonging to another species than the carrier. Strictly, it excludes the situation where the fetus is a hybrid of the carrier and another species, thereby excluding the possibility that the carrier is the biological mother of the offspring. Strictly, interspecific pregnancy is also distinguished from endoparasitism, where parasite offspring grow inside the organism of another species, not necessarily in the womb.

It has no known natural occurrence, but can be achieved artificially by transfer of embryos of one species into the womb of another.

Potential applications

Potential applications include carrying human fetuses to term as a potential yet ethically controversial alternative to surrogate mothers or artificial uteri for gay male couples, mothers with damaged uteri or heterosexual couples that do not want to risk childbirth. It would also provide a sober, drug-free and nonsmoking carrier that is less expensive than human surrogates. For animals, it could be a valuable tool in preservation programs of endangered species, providing a method of ex-situ conservation. It could also avail for recreation of extinct species.

Causes of failure
Immunologically, an embryo or fetus of an interspecific pregnancy would be equivalent to xenografts rather than allografts, putting a higher demand on gestational immune tolerance in order to avoid an immune reaction toward the fetus. Some mice experiments indicate an imbalance between Th1 and Th2 helper cells with a predominance of Th1 cytokines. However, other mice experiments indicate that an immune response towards xeno-fetuses does not belong to classical cytotoxic T lymphocyte or natural killer cell pathways.

Interspecies compatibility is related to the type of placentation, as mothers of species having the more invasive hemochorial placentation (such as humans) must create a stronger downregulation of maternal immune responses, and are thereby more receptive to fetuses of other species, compared to those with endotheliochorial (e.g. cats and dogs) or epitheliochorial placentation (e.g. pigs, ruminants, horses, whales), where there is no contact between the maternal blood and the fetal chorion.

Other potential hazards include incompatibility of nutrition or other support system. Notably, there is a risk of inappropriate interactions between the trophoblast of the fetus and the endometrium of the mother. For example, the placental glycosylation pattern at the fetomaternal interface should optimally be similar to that of the host species.

Yet, for some species, such as a Bactrian camel embryo inside a dromedary, pregnancy can be carried to term with no other intervention than the embryo transfer. This is possible for gaur embryos inside cattle as well, but with severe intrauterine growth restriction, with uncertainty of how much is caused by the IVF procedure itself, and how much is caused by interspecies incompatibility.

The ability of one species to survive inside the uterus of another species is in many cases unidirectional; that is, pregnancy would not necessarily be successful in the inverse situation where a fetus of the other species would be transferred into the uterus of the first one. For example, horse embryos survive in the donkey uterus, but donkey embryos perish in the uterus of an untreated mare. Deer mouse embryos survive in the uterus of the white-footed mouse, but the reciprocal transfer fails.

Techniques

Overcoming rejection

Methods to artificially stimulate gestational immune tolerance towards a xeno-fetus include intercurrently introducing a component of a normal allogeneic pregnancy. For example, embryos of the species Spanish ibex are aborted when inserted alone into the womb of a goat, but when introduced together with a goat embryo, they may develop to term. This technique has also been used to grow panda fetuses in a cat, but the cat mother died of pneumonia before she completed term. Also, murine embryos of Ryukyu mouse (Mus caroli)  will survive to term inside the uterus of a house mouse (Mus musculus) only if enveloped in Mus musculus trophoblast cells. Goat fetuses have likewise been successfully grown in sheep wombs by enveloping the goat inner cell mass in sheep trophoblast. Such envelopment can be created by first isolating the inner cell mass of blastocysts of the species to be reproduced by immunosurgery, wherein the blastocyst is exposed to antibodies toward that species. Because only the outer layer, that is, the trophoblastic cells, are exposed to the antibodies, only these cells will be destroyed by subsequent exposure to complement. The remaining inner cell mass can be injected into a blastocele of the recipient species to acquire its trophoblastic cells. It has been theorized that the allogeneic component prevents the production of maternal lymphocytes and cytotoxic anti-fetal antibodies, but the mechanism remains uncertain.

On the other hand, immune suppression with ciclosporin has shown no effect for this purpose. Pre-transfer immunization with antigens from the species providing the embryo has promoted more rapid and uniform failure of the interspecies pregnancy in mice, but increased survival in horse-donkey experiments.

Embryo creation
Embryos may be created by in vitro fertilization (IVF) with gametes from a male and female of the species to be reproduced. They may also be created by somatic cell nuclear transfer (SCNT) into an egg cell of another species, creating a cloned embryo that transferred into the uterus of yet another species. This technique was used for the experiment of panda fetuses in a cat mentioned in techniques for overcoming rejection. In this experiment, nuclei from cells taken from abdominal muscles of giant pandas were transferred to egg cells of rabbits and, in turn, transferred into the uterus of cat together with cat embryos. Concomitant use of SCNT and interspecific pregnancy has also been speculated to potentially recreate the mammoth species, for example by taking genetic material from mammoth specimens preserved in permafrost and transferring it into egg cells and subsequently the uterus of an elephant.

Explanatory notes

References

Mammalian pregnancy
Fertility medicine